The Global Connectivity Index (GCI) is a comprehensive guide for policy makers and industry leaders to develop a roadmap to the digital economy. The GCI has evolved, increasing the number of nations tracked in its rankings and by constantly strengthening the methodology and research standards it employs. The growth of the GCI’s database, since the first Index was published in 2014, offers practical insights and recommendations for policy makers on what it takes to succeed in the digital economy.

Scope

Today, the GCI tracks and benchmarks the progress of 79 nations toward the digital economy. Its core methodology analyzes 40 indicators that identify progress made in the interplay of ICT investment, technology adoption, user experience and market development. Based on these criteria, the Index assigns a “GCI score” for each indicator based on a realistic future target value. The movement of even a single GCI point from year to year is a significant reflection of a country’s progress toward a digital economy.

The GCI offers a unique research framework to assess a nation’s digital transformation by looking at four economic pillars namely supply, demand, experience and potential, in addition to technology enablers - broadband, cloud, AI and Internet of Things (IoT). Under this proprietary research methodology, three clusters of nations are grouped according to their GCI position and GDP per capita. The three GCI clusters – Starters (GCI Score 23-39), Adopters (score 40-64), and Frontrunners (score 65-85) – account for almost 95% of global GDP. 

Most ICT indexes focus on a single technology area such as broadband, cloud, data center or other technology enablers. What differentiates the GCI is that it is the only index available that goes deeper into key technology areas and at the same time measures their collective impact on the digital economy. In addition to the four core technology enablers, the GCI also takes into consideration other indicators such as workforce, ICT laws, and e-Government services. It is seen as an authoritative source that informs policy makers and industry leaders on their nation’s investment, adoption, quality and potential compared to their peers, as well as its related impact on the digital economy.

Key findings

The widening of the global digital divide

The recurrent theme of the GCI is that Frontrunners are pulling far ahead of nations that are lower on the spectrum of the GCI S-curve. The widening gap suggests an ICT version of sociology’s “Matthew Effect”, where the “rich get richer and the poor get poorer” based on an accumulated advantage over time. Policy makers in the Adopters, and especially in the Starters, are advised to consider the deepening inequality gap as it may have long-term consequences on their ability to compete and sustain economic growth.  

However, Frontrunners that invested heavily in ICT infrastructure over the years saw growth stagnate due to having now exhausted much of the value of that infrastructure. To drive sustainable growth, countries or organizations are advised to focus on participating in global win-win collaboration. The GCI 2019 outlines five roles needed to develop such global Intelligent Connectivity ecosystems. These are Decision Makers (countries, organizations or enterprises), Data Scientists, ICT Companies, Data Collectors, and End Users. These roles collaborate and leverage each other’s strengths to create value for all participants: nations, enterprises, and the public.

   

 

 

A comparison of GCI reports over the four-year period from 2015 through 2019 shows significant movement in country rankings. In the GCI 2019 report, most of the 79 nations in the rankings saw overall GCI scores improve. 

Key GCI findings (2015-2019)

Differences between the three GCI clusters – Starters, Adopters and Frontrunners

Starter: Average GDP per capita: US$3,800 | GCI score: 23-39 These nations are in the early stage of ICT infrastructure build-out. Their focus is on expanding connectivity to give more people access to the digital economy.

Adopter: Average GDP per capita: US$17,200 | GCI score: 40-64 Nations in this cluster experience the largest GDP growth from investment in ICT Infrastructure. Their focus is on increasing demand for high-speed connectivity to facilitate industry digitization and economic growth. 

Frontrunner: Average GDP per capita: US$58,100 | GCI score: 65-85 These nations are mainly developed economies that focus on enhancing the user experience. Their priority shifts to investment in big data and IoT to develop a smarter and more efficient society.

GCI Methodology
The GCI research model includes 40 indicators that can be analyzed in terms of four economic pillars and four technology enablers. Based on these indicators, the GCI fully and objectively measures, analyzes, and forecasts the economies tracked; quantifies the digital economy transformation journey they are undergoing; and provides a reference tool for policy makers and industry leaders. The four economic pillars are ICT supply, demand, experience, and potential. The four technology enablers are broadband, cloud services, AI, and the IoT. 

The first report published in 2014 covered 25 nations and 10 industries, including finance, manufacturing, education, transportation and logistics which accounted for 95% of global GDP. The GCI 2015 report first covered 50 nations with 38 indicators. In the GCI 2016 report, two new indicators were introduced, raising the total to 40. In addition, the GCI 2016 also included updated definitions (e.g. replacing 3G coverage with 4G coverage) based on advances in ICT. In 2018, the GCI broadened the scope from 50 to 79 nations. The research methodology was expanded in 2019 again by adding the new AI perimeter which includes: Data creation, AI Investment, AI-enabled robotics and AI potential. Intelligent Connectivity’s five enabling technologies were also consolidated into four: Broadband, Cloud, IoT and AI in the same year.

Influence 
The GCI has gradually become a global benchmark for the assessment of digital transformation. It has been cited by more than 30 authoritative agencies including: Accenture, Asia Development Bank Institute, APEC Business Advisory Council, CITADEL, Ernst & Young, Inter American Development Bank, The International Telecommunication Union, GSMA, G20 and The Center for Transatlantic Relations.

References 

Information technology